The 2018 Australian Figure Skating Championships were held on November 30 – December 7, 2018 at the Macquarie Ice Rink in Sydney, New South Wales. Medals were awarded in the disciplines of men's singles, ladies' singles, pair skating, ice dance, and synchronized skating at the senior, junior, advanced novice, intermediate novice, and basic novice levels. The results were part of the selection criteria for the 2019 World Championships, the 2019 Four Continents Championships, and the 2019 World Junior Championships.

Medals summary

Senior

Junior

Advanced novice

Senior results

Men

Ladies

Pairs

Ice dance

Synchronized

Junior results

Men

Ladies

Pairs

Ice dance

Synchronized

Advanced novice results

Boys

Girls

Pairs

Ice dance

Synchronized

International team selections

World Championships

Four Continents Championships

World Junior Championships

World Synchronized Skating Championships

World Junior Synchronized Skating Championships

External links
 2018–19 Australian Championships results

2018-19
2018 in figure skating
2019 in figure skating
Figure Skating Championships,2018-19
Figure Skating Championships,2018-19